The Trilateral Cooperation Secretariat (TCS) is an international organization established with a vision to promote Lasting Peace, Common Prosperity, and Shared Culture among China, Japan, and South Korea. Upon the agreement signed and ratified by each of the three governments, the TCS was officially inaugurated in Seoul, on 1 September 2011.  On the basis of equal participation, each government shares 1/3 of the total operational budget.

Background

Development of Trilateral Cooperation
The idea of a trilateral framework between China, Japan and the Republic of Korea has its roots in the breakfasts attended by the three leaders at the sidelines of the 1999 ASEAN+3 Summit in Manila. This meeting marked the first step for developing trilateral cooperation and its framework, with 1999 being celebrated as the first year of China-Japan-South Korea cooperation.

The three countries continued to hold annual meetings at the ASEAN+3 Summit. After several years of negotiations, the three countries agreed at the 2007 ASEAN+3 Summit to hold separate stand-alone meetings in the future. Hence, in 2008, what began as a side-conference to the ASEAN meetings officially developed into the first China-Japan-South Korea Trilateral Summit, held in Fukuoka, Japan.

Foundation of the Trilateral Cooperation Secretariat (TCS)
Discussions of a stand-alone secretariat began in 2009 at the 2nd Trilateral Summit held in Beijing, China. This was officially agreed upon by the three countries in May 2010 at the 3rd Trilateral Summit held in Jeju, Republic of Korea, where the three leaders signed the Memorandum. Later in December 2010, the three governments signed the Agreement on the Establishment of the Trilateral Cooperation Secretariat. and the Trilateral Cooperation Secretariat was finally established in Seoul, Republic of Korea in September 2011.

Organization 
The TCS consists of a Consultative Board and four Departments.

Consultative Board
The Consultative Board, the executive decision-making body of the organization, is composed of a Secretary-General (SG) and two Deputy Secretaries-General (DSG). The Secretary-General is appointed on a two-year rotational basis in the order of South Korea, Japan, and China. The other two countries nominate a Deputy Secretary-General each.

Departments
Under the Consultative Board, there are four Departments of Political Affairs, Economic Affairs, Socio-Cultural Affairs, and Management and Coordination. The Four Departments are composed of officials seconded by the three countries, and General Service Staff recruited through open competition from the three countries.

Functions
Under the mission of promoting Lasting Peace, Common Prosperity, and Shared Culture, the TCS aims to serve as a hub for the Trilateral Cooperation that encompasses a broad spectrum of sectors and actors. 
 Supporting Trilateral Consultative Mechanism
 Promoting Public Awareness on Trilateral Cooperation
 Exploring and Facilitating Cooperative Projects
 Collaborating with Other International Organizations 
 Compiling Database and Conducting Research

Projects
Youth Exchange
 Trilateral Youth Exchange Network (TYEN)
 Young Ambassador Program (YAP)
 Trilateral Youth Summit (TYS)
 Trilateral Youth Speech Contest (TYSC)
 CAMPUS Asia Alumni Network (CAAN) and Workshop
 CJK Children's Story Exchange Alumni Program
 Young Scholars Forum
 Young Rural Leaders Exchange Program
Promoting trilateral cooperation / Cooperative projects
 International Forum for Trilateral Cooperation (IFTC)
 Trilateral Entrepreneurs Forum (TEF)
 Trilateral Journalist Exchange Program (TJEP)
 CJK Virtual Marathon 
 Inter-regional Dialogue for Regional Cooperation

Research and Publications
 Trilateral Statistics Hub 
 Report “An Evolving Trilateral Cooperation: Reality and Outlook”
 Trilateral Economic Report 
 Trilateral Common Vocabulary Dictionary (TCVD) 
 Trilateral Best Practices: Application of Technology for Reducing Disaster Risks in China, Japan and Korea 
 Annual Reports 
 Other publications relating to political, economic and socio-cultural cooperation 
 Compilation of information database regarding trilateral cooperation

See also
China–Japan–South Korea trilateral summit
China–Japan–South Korea Free Trade Agreement

References

External links
 

2011 establishments in South Korea
International diplomatic organizations
International organizations based in South Korea
Organizations based in Seoul
Organizations established in 2011
China–Japan–South Korea relations